Gymnodiptychus is a genus of cyprinid fish found in freshwater habitats in the highlands of China, Kyrgyzstan and Tajikistan.

Species
There are currently three recognized species in this genus:

 Gymnodiptychus dybowskii (Kessler, 1874) (Naked osman)
 Gymnodiptychus integrigymnatus T. P. Mo, 1989
 Gymnodiptychus pachycheilus Herzenstein, 1892

References

Cyprinidae genera
Taxa named by Solomon Herzenstein
Fish of Asia